Familial is the debut solo studio album by the English musician Philip Selway, best known as the drummer of the rock band Radiohead. It was released on 30 August 2010 in the United Kingdom and received mainly positive reviews.

Music 
Familiar contains ten tracks written by Selway, with contributions from various musicians. Selway performed acoustic guitar and vocals; Pitchfork described the album as a collection of "hushed folk songs" in the tradition of the English singer-songwriter Nick Drake.

On 1 July 2010, Selway streamed the opening track from the album, "By Some Miracle", from his website, and offered a free high-quality download of the track via e-mail.

Reception

At Metacritic, which assigns a normalised rating out of 100 to reviews from mainstream critics, Familial has a score of 66, based on 18 critics, indicating "generally favorable" reviews.

Andy Kellman of AllMusic complimented the album's lyrics saying they "soothed rather than seethed" and wrote that "subtle, touching albums like this should be made more often". A mixed review from Pitchfork described Familial as a "modest, mannered record that prizes directness, simplicity and bittersweet sentiment above all, sometimes successfully, sometimes not".

Track listing

Personnel
Philip Selway
Lisa Germano
Sebastian Steinberg
Glenn Kotche
Pat Sansone

References

2010 debut albums
Bella Union albums
Philip Selway albums